The Department of Wildlife Conservation (Sinhala: වනජීවී සංරක්‍ෂණ දෙපාර්තමේන්තුව Vanajivi Sanrakshana Departhamenthuwa) is a non-ministerial government department in Sri Lanka. It is the government department responsible for maintaining national parks, nature reserves and wildlife in wilderness areas in Sri Lanka. Forest reserves and wilderness areas are maintained by the Department of Forest Conservation. The head of the Department is the Director General of Wildlife Conservation, formally known as Warden. It was established in October 1949 with Captain Cyril Nicholas, MC as its first Warden.

Personal

Head quarters
The department is headed by the Director General of Wildlife Conservation, with it headquarters located in Battaramulla. The head office is made up of several divisions covering operations and administration under the preview of Directors, Deputy Directors and Assistant Directors.

Field deployments
Each province as an Assistant Director assigned to it with an office located within the province. The Elephant Transit Home and Training Center has an Assistant Director in charge of each.

The department deploys a large number of field officers and personal to manage and protect the wildlife in the national parks. They have law enforcement powers under the Fauna and Flora Protection Ordinance and the Fire Arms Ordinance. They operate range offices and beat offices.

The field carder grades include;

 Field carder
 Park Warden (Officer in charge of a National Park)
 Wildlife Ranger
 Wildlife Range Assistant
 Wildlife Guard (who also serve as trackers)

List of national parks administered by the Department

List of nature reserves

 Vidataltivu Nature Reserve

Conservation centers under the Department

 Udawalawe Elephant Transit Centre

See also
Department of Forest Conservation
Department of National Zoological Gardens

References

External links
Department of Wildlife Conservation, Sri Lanka
Department of animal protection and health Sri Lanka
Veterinary public health Sri Lanka

Wildlife Conservation

Wildlife conservation organizations
Sri Lanka
Wildlife conservation in Sri Lanka
Environmental organisations based in Sri Lanka